Calca Province is one of thirteen provinces in the Cusco Region in the southern highlands of Peru. Its seat is Calca.

Geography 
The province is bounded to the north by the La Convención Province, to the east by the Paucartambo Province, to the south by the Cusco Province and the Quispicanchi Province, and to the west by the Urubamba Province.

It is traversed by the  Urupampa mountain range. Other mountains are listed below:

The Willkanuta River which flows through the Sacred Valley is one of the most important rivers of the province.

Political division
The province is divided into eight districts (singular: distrito), each of which is headed by a mayor (alcalde). The districts, with their capitals in parentheses, are:

 Calca (Calca)
 Coya (Coya)
 Lamay (Lamay)
 Lares (Lares)
 Pisac (Pisac)
 San Salvador (San Salvador)
 Taray (Taray)
 Yanatile (Quebrada Honda)

Ethnic groups 
The people in the province are mainly indigenous citizens of Quechua descent. Quechua is the language which the majority of the population (69.92%) learnt to speak in childhood, 29.47% of the residents started speaking in Spanish.

Archaeological sites 
The archaeological complex of P'isaq including Inti Watana is one of the prominent sites with    remains of the Inca period in the province. Other archaeological sites are Chawaytiri, Llamayuq, Qhapaq Kancha and Mawk'ataray.

See also 
 Challwaqucha
 Kimsaqucha (Lamay)
 Kimsaqucha (Pisac)
 Kuntur Wachana (film)
 Qiwñaqucha
 Quriqucha
 Sallqaqucha wallata warak'ay
 Saqra
 Willka Raymi

Sources

External links
  Municipal web site

Provinces of the Cusco Region